The Samsung Galaxy A33 5G is a mid-range Android-based smartphone developed and manufactured by Samsung Electronics as a part of its Galaxy 
A series. The phone was announced on 17 March 2022 at the Samsung Galaxy Unpacked event alongside the Galaxy A53 5G and Galaxy A73 5G.

Design 

The screen is made of Corning Gorilla Glass 5. The back panel and sides are made of frosted plastic.

The back of the smartphone is similar to the Samsung Galaxy A53 5G and Samsung Galaxy A73 5G. The Galaxy A33, unlike the Galaxy A32, does not have a 3.5 mm audio jack. Also the Galaxy A33 has protection against moisture and dust according to the IP67 standard.

On the bottom are the USB-C connector, speaker and microphone. The second microphone is located on the top and, depending on the version, a slot for 1 SIM card and a microSD memory card up to 1 TB or a hybrid slot for 2 SIM cards. On the right side are the volume buttons and the smartphone lock button.

The smartphone is sold in 4 colors: black (Awesome Black), white (Awesome White), blue (Awesome Blue) and orange (Awesome Peach).

Specifications

Hardware 
The Galaxy A33 5G is a smartphone with a slate-type factor form, which is 159.7 × 74 × 8.1 mm in size and weighs 186 grams.

The device is equipped with GSM, HSPA, LTE and 5G connectivity, Wi-Fi 802.A/b/g/n/ac dual-band with Bluetooth 5 Wi-Fi Direct support and hotspot support.1 with A2DP and LE, GPS with BeiDou, Galileo, GLONASS and QZSS and NFC. It has a USB-C2 port.0. 3.5 mm audio jack is missing. It is resistant to water and powder with IP67 certification.

It has a 6.4 inch diagonal touchscreen, Super AMOLED Infinity-U-type, rounded corners and FHD+ resolution of 1080 × 2400 pixels. Support the 90 Hz refresh rate. As a protection you use Gorilla Glass 5.

The 5000 mAh lithium polymer battery is not removable by the user. Supports ultra-fast charging at 25 W.

The chipset is a Samsung Exynos 1200 with an octagonal CPU (2 cores at 2.4 GHz + 6 cores at 2 GHz). The internal eMMC-type memory 5.1 is 128/256 GB expandable with microSD up to 1 TB, while the RAM is 6 or 8 GB (depending on the version chosen).

The rear camera has a 48 MP main sensor with an f/1 opening. The D-SLR-Focus is equipped with a PDAF, OIS, HDR mode and flash LED, capable of recording up to 4K to 30 photograms per second, while the front camera is single 13 MP with recording.

Software 
The operating system is Android 12 with One UI 4.1.

References 

Samsung Galaxy
Mobile phones introduced in 2022
Android (operating system) devices
Samsung smartphones
Mobile phones with multiple rear cameras
Mobile phones with 4K video recording